Tauragė (see other names) is an industrial city in Lithuania, and the capital of Tauragė County. In 2020, its population was 21,520. Tauragė is situated on the Jūra River, close to the border with the Kaliningrad Oblast, and not far from the Baltic Sea coast.

Although first mentioned in 1507, Tauragė received its city charter only in 1924 and its coat of arms (a silver hunting horn in a red field) in 1997. Notable buildings in the city include the castle (19th c. Russian Empire Customs) (currently housing Tauragė Region Museum, Tourism Information Centre), 19th c. Post office, beautiful buildings from the  20th c. inter-war period, several churches: the Lutheran (built in 1843), the Catholic (1904) and Orthodox (1933). Lithuanian, Swedish and Danish factories operate in the city. Nowadays Tauragė is famous for its car markets and adventure parks.

Names and etymology

In Lithuanian, Tauragė  is a conjunction of two words: tauras which means "aurochs", and ragas which means "horn", hence the city's coat of arms. The city is known as Tauragie in Samogitian, as Tauroggen in German, Taurogi in Polish, Tovrig in Yiddish, and Taurage (historically Tauroggen [] or Taurogi []) in Russian.

History

Tauragė is situated between two Baltic tribes and at the edge of two historical regions. In 13th c. donations written by Mindaugas, the king of Lithuania mentions that there are lands called Karšuva (Carsovia) and Skalva (Scalovia). On the eve of the Teutonic Order aggression, Skalva was situated southwest of the current town. It was inhabited by the Baltic tribe Skalviai (Scalovians). To the northeast there was a land called Žemaitija (Samogitia) with Žemaičiai (Samogitians) as inhabitants. Karšuva, the region which existed in these lands, was different because the peoples had the blood of the Kuršiai  (Curonians) and Lamatiečiai (Lamatians), two nearby Baltic tribes. By inhabiting the northern borders of Skalva, the Carsovians became close to the Scalovians. Even the origin of the name Karšuva (Carsovia) can be linked to the ethnonym Kuršiai (Curonians), which is written as Cori, Corres, Kauren in the old historical sources. 
When the war with Teutonic Order broke out, ethnic and administrative borders started to change rapidly. It is possible that in the end of the 13th c. and the start of 14th c., when Skalva suffered heavy casualties, Samogitians, supported by the rulers of the Grand Duchy of Lithuania, tried to push to the southwest. But due to non-stopping attacks by the Teutonic Order in the 14th c. they had to retreat. Only in the 15-16th c. when the wars were over, Samogitians came back to their former lands. At that time northern parts of Skalva, which were left for Lithuania, was inhabited by Samogitians, because most of the Scalovians were killed or fled during the attacks of the Order.

First mentioned in 1507, the town has been a center of Lutheranism in Lithuania. Although it belonged to the Grand Duchy of Lithuania, there was an interesting period when the land of Tauragė belonged to East Prussian rulers in economical terms. From 1691 until 1795, Tauragė belonged to Brandenburg-Prussia, after the marriage of Margrave Ludwig of Brandenburg with Princess Ludwika Karolina Radziwiłł. Afterwards, in 1795, as almost all the Grand Duchy of Lithuania, the town became part of the Russian Empire.

Tsar Alexander I of Russia, signed an armistice with Napoleon I in Tauragė on June 21, 1807, that was soon to be followed with the Treaties of Tilsit. On December 30, 1812, the Prussian General Yorck, signed the Convention of Tauroggen, declaring his troops neutral, that effectively ended the fragile Franco-Prussian alliance during the French invasion of Russia. In 1836, much of the city was destroyed by a fire. Honoré de Balzac stayed in Tauragė in 1843.

In 1915, a significant part of the city's infrastructure was destroyed by German troops during World War I. During the independent Republic of Lithuania (1918-1940), the war destroyed town grew rapidly and new modern buildings, factories were built. On September 9, 1927, the rebellion against the authoritarian rule of President Antanas Smetona broke out in Tauragė, but the revolt was quickly suppressed. After the Soviet annexation of Lithuania in 1940, the Tauragė Castle was a place of imprisonment for Lithuanian political dissidents and POWs. Many local inhabitants, including the parents and relatives of Roman Abramovich, were exiled to Siberia during the Soviet occupation in 1940. This saved the family from the Holocaust. When Operation Barbarossa commenced on June 22, 1941, the Soviets retreated, and Tauragė was captured by the German Wehrmacht after heavy bombing on the same day. About 4,000 Jews were murdered in Tauragė and nearby villages (about 40% of Tauragė population). In the autumn of 1944, the German occupation ended with the Soviets replacing them with a renewed occupation lasting until 1990. During the Soviet occupation the town was rebuilt and grew very rapidly, although the pre-war old town architecture was not preserved. Even the old market square and one of the main streets, Kęstučio, had been completely destroyed and built over. Only some old buildings of the town centre have survived to this day.

Sport 
Tauragė is known for having one main football club FK Tauras Tauragė which was founded in 1922.

Notable people 

Ernestas Šetkus - Lithuanian footballer
Rokas Baciuška - Lithuanian professional rally driver
Jurgis Baltrušaitis - Poet
Jacob Epstein - art collector
Samuel Isaac Joseph Schereschewsky - Anglican Bishop of Shanghai, China
Tauras Jogėla - Lithuanian basketball player
Svajūnas Adomaitis - Lithuanian Greco-Roman wrestler
Edgaras Venckaitis - Lithuanian wrestler
Rokas Giedraitis - Lithuanian basketball player
Remigijus Šimašius - Lithuanian politician and lawyer
Solomon Levitan - American politician
Nerija Putinaitė - Lithuanian philosopher and politician

Twin towns – sister cities

Tauragė is twinned with:

 Bełchatów, Poland
 Bytów, Poland
 Považská Bystrica, Slovakia
 Riedstadt, Germany
 Ternopil, Ukraine
 Zestaponi, Georgia

References

External links

Municipal website  
Randburg.com
Aerial photo from January 1945
The murder of the Jews of Tauragė during World War II, at Yad Vashem website.

 
Cities in Tauragė County
Capitals of Lithuanian counties
Cities in Lithuania
Municipalities administrative centres of Lithuania
Duchy of Samogitia
Rossiyensky Uyezd
Holocaust locations in Lithuania